Mór or Mor is a given name which can be either masculine or feminine. It may refer to:

 Mór Adler (1826–1902), Hungarian artist
 Mor Bulis (born 1996), Israeli tennis player
 Mor Dahan (born 1989), Israeli footballer
 Mor Diouf (born 1988), Senegalese footballer
 Mór Jókai (1825–1904), Hungarian dramatist and novelist
 Mor Karbasi, Israeli singer and songwriter
 Mor Katzir (born 1980), an Israeli model
 Mór Kóczán (1885–1972), Hungarian javelin thrower
 Mór Muman (died 630s?), Irish noblewoman or possibly a goddess
 Mór Than (1828–1899), Hungarian painter
 Mór Ní Tuathail (c. 1114–1191), Queen-consort of Leinster
 Mór Perczel (1811–1899), Hungarian landholder, general, and one of the leaders of the Hungarian Revolution of 1848
 Mor Sæther (1793–1851), Norwegian herbalist
 Mor Shushan (born 1988), Israeli footballer 
 Mór Ungerleider (1872–1955), Hungarian cafe owner and co-founder of an early film distribution company; the first person to show a film in Hungary

Hungarian masculine given names
Irish-language feminine given names
Unisex given names